Rökkvi Vésteinsson (born March 22, 1978) is an Icelandic comedian. He was born in the capital city of Iceland, Reykjavík. He has performed standup comedy in Iceland and Montreal and Ottawa, Canada, as well as in Ireland, Belgium and the Netherlands. He studied improv with Terence Bowman in Montreal, who is a founding member of an improv troupe called On the Spot (Improv).

Tours
September 2006 – October 2006: "Documentary Tour" in Canada, England, and Ireland
28 February 2008 – 9 March 2008: "Damaged Goods Tour" ("Skemmd Vara") in the Netherlands and Belgium

References

External links
Official international website of Rökkvi
Official Icelandic website of Rökkvi

1978 births
Rokkvi Vesteinsson
Living people